Wilhelm Klitsch (1882–1941) was an Austrian stage and film actor.

Selected filmography
 On the Heights (1916)
 The Spendthrift (1917)
 In the Line of Duty (1917)
 Lebenswogen (1917)
 Rigoletto (1918)
 The Voice of Conscience (1920)
 The Master of Life (1920)

References

Bibliography
 Klossner, Michael. The Europe of 1500-1815 on Film and Television: A Worldwide Filmography of Over 2550 Works, 1895 Through 2000. McFarland, 2002.

External links

1882 births
1941 deaths
Austrian male film actors
Austrian film directors
Male actors from Vienna